There are UNICEF National Committees in 34 countries worldwide, each established as an independent local non-governmental organization. Serving as the public face and dedicated voice of UNICEF, the National Committees raise funds from the private sector, promote children's rights, and secure worldwide visibility for children threatened by poverty, disasters, armed conflict, abuse and exploitation.

UNICEF is funded exclusively by voluntary contributions, and the National Committees collectively raise around one-third of UNICEF's annual income. This comes through contributions from corporations, civil society organizations and more than 6 million individual donors worldwide. They also rally many different partners – including the media, national and local government officials, NGOs, specialists such as doctors and lawyers, corporations, schools, young people and the general public – on issues related to children’s rights.

Countries

The following countries are home to UNICEF national committees.

 UNICEF Committee for Andorra
 UNICEF Australia
 UNICEF Austria
 UNICEF Belgium
 UNICEF Canada
 Czech Committee for UNICEF
 UNICEF Denmark
 UNICEF Finland
 UNICEF France
 UNICEF Germany
 Hong Kong Committee for UNICEF
 UNICEF Hungary
 UNICEF Iceland
 UNICEF Ireland
 Israeli Fund for UNICEF
 UNICEF Italy
 UNICEF Japan
 Korean Committee for UNICEF
  Lithuanian National Committee for UNICEF
  Liechtenstein National Committee for UNICEF
 UNICEF Luxembourg
 UNICEF the Netherlands
 UNICEF New Zealand
 UNICEF Norway
 UNICEF Poland
 UNICEF Portugal
 UNICEF Slovakia
 UNICEF Slovenia
 UNICEF Spain
 UNCEF Sweden
 UNICEF Switzerland
 UNICEF Turkey
 UNICEF UK
 U.S. Fund for UNICEF

References

National Committees